Wanda Batista (born 1958) is a Puerto Rican gospel singer. She has released six albums.

Biography
Batista was born and raised in Ponce, Puerto Rico. At the age of 19, she became a singer. In 1987, Batista released her first album.

Discography
A Ti Jehova
Tu Podras Vencer
Vision Celestial
Tienes Que Cambiar (1987)
Le Vere (1993)
Porque Eres Bueno (2011)

See also
List of Puerto Ricans

References

External links 
  
 

1958 births
Living people
Puerto Rican Christians
Singers from Ponce